Arkansas wine refers to wine made from grapes grown in the U.S. state of Arkansas.  Many of these wines are grown from traditional European wine grapes of the Vitis vinifera group such as Cabernet Sauvignon, Chardonnay, Pinot noir, and Riesling but Arkansas also makes wine from its native grapes, the Cynthiana and Muscadine.

History
Winemaking in Arkansas dates back to the first French Catholic settlers, and commercial winemaking started in the 1870s with German and Swiss settlers who came to Altus, Arkansas and found the climate favorable to growing grapes. One of these settlers was Jacob Post, who emigrated to the area in 1872 and his descendants are sixth generation winemakers. The four oldest running wineries in the state (Wiederkehr, Post, Mount Bethel and Cowie) are all located in Altus. At one point Arkansas had 160 wineries and produced more wine and grapes than any other state. Prohibition in the United States reduced the wineries to only a few that remain today, and about half of Arkansas's counties remain dry.

Arkansas winemaking today
There are at least fourteen wineries listed in Arkansas, and the state has three designated American Viticultural Areas. The University of Arkansas has worked with the Post family for nearly a century to develop new grapes and harvesting technology. John Clark, a horticulture professor at the University of Arkansas, has worked for 20 years on grapes that can withstand Arkansas' natural problems, such as high humidity.

See also
American wine

References

 
Wine regions of the United States by state